Angelika Bahmann (born 1 April 1952 in Plauen) is a former East German slalom canoeist and trainer who competed in the 1970s. She won a gold medal in the K-1 event at the 1972 Summer Olympics in Munich.

Bahmann also won six medals in the ICF Canoe Slalom World Championships with three golds (K-1: 1971, 1977; K-1 team: 1971), two silvers (K-1 team: 1975, 1977) and a bronze (K-1: 1975).

Bahmann's son, Christian, competed in slalom canoeing for Germany in the late 1990s and 2000s.

Awards and honours
 1971 Patriotic Order of Merit in bronze
 1972 Patriotic Order of Merit in silver

References
42–83 from Medal Winners ICF updated 2007.pdf?MenuID=Results/1107/0,Medal_winners_since_1936/1510/0 ICF medalists for Olympic and World Championships – Part 2: rest of flatwater (now sprint) and remaining canoeing disciplines: 1936–2007.

External links

1952 births
Living people
People from Plauen
Canoeists at the 1972 Summer Olympics
East German female canoeists
Olympic canoeists of East Germany
Olympic gold medalists for East Germany
Olympic medalists in canoeing
Medalists at the 1972 Summer Olympics
Medalists at the ICF Canoe Slalom World Championships
Sportspeople from Saxony